Sir William Richard Benyon  ( Shelley; 17 January 1930 – 2 May 2014), usually known as Bill Benyon, was a British Conservative Party politician, Berkshire landowner and High Sheriff.

Life and career
Benyon was the eldest of four sons of Vice-Admiral Richard Shelley (1892–1968) and his wife, Eve Alice Gascoyne-Cecil, the daughter of the Right Reverend Lord (Rupert Ernest) William Gascoyne-Cecil, Bishop of Exeter.  William's father, Richard (son of Lieutenant-Colonel Sir John Shelley, 9th Bt., by Marion Emma Benyon, daughter of Richard Fellowes Benyon), changed his (and thus his son's) name from Shelley to Benyon in 1964 (deed poll) and 1967 (Royal Licence) after inheriting the Englefield estate from his second cousin, Sir Henry Benyon, 1st Bt., in 1959.

Benyon joined the Royal Navy in 1943 (aged 13) and attended Britannia Royal Naval College, Dartmouth. He retired from the Navy as a Lieutenant in 1956 and became a member of The Castaways' Club soon thereafter. He was with Courtaulds Ltd until 1967.

Benyon joined the Conservative Monday Club prior to 1970, when he was elected as Member of Parliament for Buckingham at the 1970 general election, defeating the incumbent Robert Maxwell, and retained his seat at the next three elections.  At the 1983 general election he stood instead in the new Milton Keynes constituency, where he was re-elected until he retired at the 1992 general election. Due to its increased population, the Milton Keynes seat was then divided into two new constituencies: Milton Keynes North East and Milton Keynes South West. This was the only division of a constituency at the 1992 general election.

Benyon never held government office, but was PPS to Paul Channon 1972–74 when he was Minister for Housing, then was an Opposition whip from 1974 to 1976. He served as a member of the University of Reading Council from 1967 to 2002, was a member of Berkshire County Council from 1964 to 1974, a Deputy Lieutenant from 1970, a Berkshire JP 1962–77, Vice Lord Lieutenant for Berkshire from 1994 (the year he was knighted), and High Sheriff of Berkshire in 1995. He was chairman of the Peabody Trust, 1992–1998, and of the Ernest Cook Trust from 1992. He was a member of Boodle's, Pratt's and Beefsteak London clubs. He lived at Englefield House until the last few years of his life and was a director of the Englefield Charitable Trust. He died on 2 May 2014, at age 84.

In May 1993, Benyon was awarded an honorary degree by the Open University as Doctor of the University.

Family
Benyon married Elizabeth Hallifax in 1957. They had two sons, three daughters and 18 grandchildren, who all survived him. His elder son, Richard Benyon, was the Conservative MP for Newbury from 2005 to 2019. His daughter, Mary, wife of Tom Riall, was appointed High Sheriff of Berkshire in April 2020.

Ancestors

References

Times Guide to the House of Commons, 1987 and 1992 editions

External links
 

1930 births
2014 deaths
Royal Navy officers
Royal Navy personnel of World War II
Conservative Party (UK) MPs for English constituencies
High Sheriffs of Berkshire
Benton, William
Members of Berkshire County Council
UK MPs 1970–1974
UK MPs 1974
UK MPs 1974–1979
UK MPs 1979–1983
UK MPs 1983–1987
UK MPs 1987–1992
Politics of Milton Keynes
Graduates of Britannia Royal Naval College
People from Islington (district)
People from Hackney Central
People from De Beauvoir Town
English landowners
Benyon family
Knights Bachelor
Politicians awarded knighthoods
20th-century English landowners
20th-century British businesspeople